The 2019 Bolivian protests, also known as the Pitita Revolution, were protests and marches from 21 October 2019 until late November of that year in Bolivia, in response to claims of electoral fraud in the 2019 general election of 20 October. After 11 November 2019, there were protests by supporters of the outgoing government in response to Jeanine Áñez becoming the acting president of Bolivia. The claims of fraud were made after the suspension of the preliminary vote count, in which incumbent Evo Morales was not leading by a large enough margin (10%) to avoid a runoff, and the subsequent publication of the official count, in which Morales won by just over 10%. Some international observers expressed concern over the integrity of the elections.

While the majority of the demonstrations were peaceful, there were also numerous acts of violence. Initial violence allegedly targeted opposition protesters, Pro-MAS supporters were bused into opposition areas, given weapons, and were told to clear blockades, resulting in death and injury of opposition protesters. In the later weeks of the protests, senior members of the Movement for Socialism (MAS) and their families were victims of attacks, including vandalism and arson of their houses.

Morales denied the allegations and invited international observers to audit the electoral processes, promising to hold a runoff if any fraud was found, although initially refusing to be bound by the results of an audit. Opposition leaders rejected the OAS audit, saying they hadn't been party to the agreement. Subsequently, an audit team from the Organization of American States (OAS), with access provided by Bolivian authorities, worked to verify the integrity and reliability of the results. Their preliminary report, released on 10 November 2019 questioned the integrity of the election results and recommended another "electoral process".

Following the release of the OAS initial report, Morales announced the government would hold another full election (rather than a runoff). However, later that day, the influential National Union of Workers requested Morales' resignation, followed 5 hours later by the commanders of the Armed Forces who suggested Morales resign during a live televised press conference, and almost immediately after, the national Police Commander also requested his resignation. Morales, together with his Vice President Álvaro García Linera, resigned the same day, on live television, both also delivered written resignations. In Morales's case, he would later describe in his memoir Volveremos y seremos millones (We'll come back and we'll be millions) that he made the decision to resign the night before the requests. Following his resignation and the resignations of the next two politicians in the line of succession, Jeanine Áñez, second vice-president of the Senate, was next in line for the presidency. On 12 November 2019, she formed an interim government.

Protests continued until the end of November, primarily by those that sought Morales' return. Under direction from Morales and his allies, and at times under coercion, protesters created blockades on inter-departmental highways, resulting in shortages of food and fuel. The UN High Commissioner for Human Rights expressed concerns over the use of force by the new government in response to armed protests at Senkata and Sacaba. By 25 November 2019, the interim government had made agreements with most protest leaders to end blockades, and began to withdraw troops and to release arrested protesters.

Background

Term limits

Article 168 of the 2009 constitution allowed the president and vice-president to be re-elected only once, limiting the number of terms to two. The governing party, the Movement for Socialism (MAS) sponsored an effort to amend this article. The referendum was authorized by a joint session of the Plurinational Legislative Assembly on 26 September 2015, by a vote of 112 to 41. Law 757, which convened the February referendum, passed by 113 votes to 43 and was promulgated on 5 November 2015.

The referendum marked the rise of anti-Morales sentiment in Bolivia. The vote was held on 21 February 2016 and the proposed amendment was rejected by 51.3% to 48.7%. A successful "yes" vote would have allowed President Evo Morales and Vice President Álvaro García Linera to run for another term in office in 2019. Morales had already been elected three times. The first time, in 2006, is not counted, as it was before the two-term limit was introduced by the 2009 constitution.

Despite the referendum result, the Plurinational Constitutional Tribunal overruled the constitution by deferring to Article 23 of the American Convention on Human Rights, which promotes the human right to participate in government. The court ruled a little over one year after the referendum in December 2017 that all public offices would have no term limits, thus allowing Morales to run for a fourth term.

The removal of term limits proved controversial among Bolivians, including Morales' supporters, with some losing trust in Morales for overturning a referendum. John Walsh, Andes Director of the Washington Office on Latin America, stated that "The court’s decision, which was very much in favor of MAS, added to the tensions and distrust leading into this election" and that for Morales, it was "also just hard to be in power for that long and not lose popularity". Mark L. Schneider of the Center for Strategic and International Studies summarized that there was "no question that there was a successful impact on raising the standard of living of the poor" under Morales, but that "problems in Bolivia arose, unfortunately, from the same problems that you see in Nicaragua and Venezuela, in Honduras and elsewhere where individuals decide that it's more important to stay in power than to follow democratic norms and the rule of law".

2019 general election

Heading into the elections, some voters distrusted Bolivia's voting system, suspecting fraud after Morales and his supporters disregarded the results of the 2016 referendum. Bolivia's Plurinational Electoral Body and the private company in charge of the preliminary vote count ad announced eleven days before the election, on 9 October, that only approximately 80% of the preliminary results would be released. On 20 October 2019, the first round of voting for all government positions was held. The Supreme Electoral Tribunal released two sets of counts shortly after the vote was closed. First was an exit poll that verified 95.6% of votes that showed incumbent President of Bolivia Evo Morales as having 9.33 percentage points over his main opposition and former president, Carlos Mesa. Leading by less than 10 percentage points indicates the vote must continue to a second run-off round. The complete count then appeared as provisional results on a website with routine live updates. At the point of 83.8% of votes in the complete count having been verified, the website showed Morales at 45.3% and Mesa at 38.2%; this also reflected a less than ten-point lead. However, no further updates to the preliminary results were made after 7:40 pm local time (UTC–4). The electoral authorities explained that updates to the preliminary count had been halted because the official results were beginning to be released; nevertheless, no official results were published overnight.

At 9:25 pm, as the vote counting was still underway, President Morales declared himself the winner of the elections, stating that while he would wait for final scrutiny of the results, the outstanding vote from rural areas would guarantee his victory; he did not mention the possibility of a runoff. Most of the remaining votes, from remote rural areas, were expected to go in Morales's favour, although the Organization of American States (OAS) recommended a runoff be held even if Morales's lead exceeded 10 points. Manuel González, head of the OAS election observation team in Bolivia, said that "In the case that [...] the margin of difference exceeds 10%, it is statistically reasonable to conclude that it will be by negligible margin" and that "given the context and the problematic issues in this electoral process the best option continues to be the convening of a second round." International observers expressed concern over the unexplained daylong gap in the reporting of results, which was followed by a surge in Morales votes when the count resumed.

On 21 October 2019, a press conference of the Plurinational Electoral Organ was held, which published data of the rapid count of the system of Transmisión de Resultados Electorales Preliminares (TREP, "Transmission of Preliminary Electoral Results"), published at 7:30 pm, almost a whole day after being initially suspended, stating that with 95.30 percent of the votes verified, Morales's MAS obtained 46.86% of the votes over the 36.72% of Mesa's Civic Community, surpassing the 10 percentage points needed to avoid a second run-off round and as such Morales would remain in power for a fourth term.

On 6 November, the Bolivian opposition published a 190-page-long report containing fraud accusations, including irregularities such as mistaken electoral acts additions, data wiping and electoral acts where the ruling party obtained more votes than registered voters, expecting to send it to international organizations such as the OAS and the United Nations.

Timeline of events

Anti-Morales protests

21 October

Citizens held vigils at the gates of the computing centers of several departments. The Commander of the Bolivian Police, Vladimir Calderón, said they were on alert for any event that could alter public order in the country after some social sectors called for civil resistance.

According to Los Tiempos, on the morning of 21 October, in the Sopocachi and Miraflores residential neighborhoods of La Paz, ballots marked in favor of MAS and electoral material were found in the hands of people that were not Electoral Tribunal officials; videos of citizen reports circulating on social media show the police deploying tear gas against the residents of those residential neighborhoods and protecting the electoral material and the suspects. As a result, the District Board of Parents requested the suspension of classes at schools in downtown Sucre.

Protests in Sucre became violent, and the violence was severe to the point that a fire broke out in the campaign house of MAS and the offices of the Single Federation of Workers of Peoples Originating in Chuquisaca (Futpoch) were attacked. Subsequently, female police officers members of the National Association of NCOs, Sergeants, Cabos and Police (Anssclapol) marched, calling for a peaceful night, on the 25 de Mayo Square. At the head was their leader, Sergeant Cecilia Calani, who was wearing a white handkerchief, demanding that the president respect the vote.

Protesters set fire to electoral buildings and ballot boxes in the cities of Sucre and Tarija. In Potosí, the COMCIPO march ended with the electoral court of the region being set on fire, damaging nearby homes. Campfires and vigils by university students, supporters of Carlos Mesa and activists were set in other counting centers such as in Hotel Presidente, Hotel Real, Campo Ferial de Cochabamba. Police from Sucre were sent to Potosí to reinforce security and avoid possible disturbances before the vigil of citizens at the gates of the Departmental Electoral Court (TED), which denounced irregularities in the counting and computing of voting polls.

At Hotel Real a clash between opponents and supporters of Morales and police took place; opposition groups were attacked with tear gas by the police. Dozens were wounded, including the rector of the Higher University of San Andrés (UMSA), Waldo Albarracín, who was taken to the UMSA hospital. Subsequently, the computing center at the Hotel Presidente suspended the vote count due to the protests that were in place.

Four departmental electoral tribunals suspended the vote counting made by the TREP due to protests by citizens registered outside the computing centers. The Mayor of Cobija, Luis Gatty Ribeiro, and the Governor of Pando, Luis Adolfo Flores, were attacked by a group of protesters, with Flores being hospitalized. In Oruro, a MAS tent and a Public Ministry vehicle were destroyed.

22 October

At dawn on 22 October, the head of a statue of Hugo Chávez was found at the door of the home of the Mayor of Riberalta, Omar Núñez Vela Rodríguez, after the statue was toppled and shattered by protesters. Chávez, former president of Venezuela, was a friend and ally of Morales. In Cochabamba, after violence at the Alalay Fairgrounds (FEICOBOL), which occurred between students and police on 21 October 37 students from the Universidad Mayor de San Simón (UMSS) protested at Sucre Square against the alleged electoral fraud at noon. The police intervened with tear gas.

Epifanio Ramón Morales, leader of the Ponchos Rojos organization, announced that they would hold marches in support of Morales, not ruling out including blocking roads and forming fences, in La Paz, and warned that they would respond to attacks with chicotes (whips) and weapons.

23 October
Around noon, leaders of the Local University Federation (FUL) and university students seized the facilities of the Civic Committee of Tarija, ignoring the board because of their alleged political affinity with the ruling MAS party, and abiding by the indefinite strike called by the Conade.

In Chuquisaca, Santa Cruz, Tarija, Beni and Cochabamba, the first day of an indefinite public strike began. Kathia Antequera filed a formal complaint about the disappearance of Eduardo Gutiérrez, the spokesperson of the 21F party; he reappeared later that day.

The presidential candidate for Third System Movement (MTS), and former Education Minister, Félix Patzi, also spoke out against the fact that the votes for his party were passed to the MAS in the provinces of Larecaja, Caranavi and Palos Blancos.

24 October
The Chuquisaca Departmental Electoral Court announced that the vote counting was being carried out in the municipality of Zudañez, because its facilities in the city of Sucre had been burned in the protests. The count was carried out in the meeting room of the Public Production Company Glass Containers of Bolivia. Likewise, the Electoral Tribunal of Potosí ended the recount in the municipality of Llallagua, without notifying the delegates of the opposition political parties. The counts show that in the municipalities of Zudañez and Llallagua the government party managed to obtain more than two thirds of the votes.

A group of MAS supporters expelled a group of opponents from Plaza 14 de Septiembre in Cochabamba minutes before Morales gave a speech in the square. Opponents, who were on strike, reported receiving insults and threats.

Towards the end of the day, clashes were recorded in the city of Santa Cruz between those supporting the victory of Evo Morales, and those demanding a second round. According to initial reports, several people were injured by stones and fighting in the municipality of El Torno. In Cochabamba, there were clashes between students and supporters of President Evo Morales, and the police dispersed them with tear gas. MAS militants announced that they will remain in Cochabamba keeping vigil "until the final results." Luis Fernando Camacho, president of the Civic Committee in Santa Cruz, again addressed the people of Santa Cruz reaffirming the call for strikes, and noting that Bolivia will not go to a second round with the same electoral authorities that oversaw this electoral process.

Some Bolivians living in Madrid, Milan and Berlin demonstrated, demanding a second round between the leading candidates.

At 7:00 pm local time, the Plurinational Electoral Body published the vote count in Bolivia and abroad (the result 'Mundo') at 99.99% counted, with Morales winning over 40% with a lead of 10.56 points over the other candidates, as a provisional result.

25 October 

By Friday 25 October, when the results were officially announced with Morales as the winner, several countries in Latin America, as well as the United States and European Union, had called for the second round to go ahead regardless. From Thursday evening through the night, protestors filled the streets of the capital, chanting that Bolivia "is not Cuba or Venezuela" and should be respected.

26 October 
Demonstrations occurred again in various regions. In Cochabamba, Santa Cruz and La Paz, the streets were again confronted by mass in the morning, and residents returned to the shopping center to buy groceries. In Oruro, students suspended the folkloric university entrance.

A group of free transportation drivers, armed with sticks and stones, went from the centre of Cochabamba to the south of the city, to unblock the highways in the urban centre. According to official reports, the police mobilized to avoid confrontation and vandalism. According to who recorded the video filmed by residents in the area, the police only escorted armed groups. They also reported that rioters damaged the windshield of the car while travelling.

27 October
Members of the Mamore-Bulo Bulo Coca Farmers Federation blocked the main road from Cochabamba to Santa Cruz, on the Ichilo Bridge in Bulo Bulo, to show their support for President Evo Morales. Coca farmers have announced that they will not let motorized vehicles pass this road.

28 October

On 28 October, a massive blockade took place between supporters and opponents of Morales in La Paz, Sucre and Cochabamba.

31 October 
The government announced that at least two people had died in protests since 21 October, both in the town of Montero. The same day, the OAS began their audit of the election; they said it would take up to 12 days to complete, with Spain, Paraguay and Mexico monitoring.

6 November 
On 6 of November opposition protesters storm the municipality of Vinto's offices and kidnap the Mayor Patricia Guzman Arce and set the building on fire.  Protesters beat her, cut her hair, and force her to walk barefoot 40 blocks where then they urinate and spit on her.

7 November 
On 7 November, the death toll from the protests rose to three as a 20-year-old student called Limbert Guzman was killed during a confrontational protest.

8 November 
By 8 November, members of the police had joined the protests; in the evening, several could be seen protesting with flags on the roof of the Cochabamba police department, as well as in La Paz, Santa Cruz, and Sucre.

9 November 
9 November opposition protesters on Oruro burn down the governor, Victor Hugo Vasquez, house down. They also to burn down the house of the governor of Chuquisaca Esteban Urquizu. Also burned was the house of MAS senator Omar Aguilar. They all subsequently resign.

9 November opposition protesters burn down Evo Morales' sister's house in Oruro.

President Evo Morales invited parties to conduct "open dialogue". But Carlos Mesa refused and answered: "I have nothing to negotiate with Evo Morales and his government".

The Bolivian army for the first time since the presidential election, declared they would not oppose the Bolivian people as long as they asked for a political solution to overcome this problem.

That night, fearing the conflicts that could erupt the following day, Evo Morales made the decision to resign, but didn't make it public.

10 November

On 10 November the Organization of American States published the report that their technical audit conducted after the elections. The report alleged multiple serious irregularities, including "manipulations of the I.T. system [that] are of such magnitude that they should be investigated in depth by the Bolivian State in order to get to the bottom of them and determine who is responsible for such a serious situation." They stated that "it is statistically unlikely that Morales obtained the 10% difference needed to avoid a second round." They maintained that "the audit team cannot validate the results of this election and therefore recommends another electoral process. Any future process should be overseen by new electoral authorities to ensure the conduct of credible elections."

The same day, General Williams Kaliman asked Morales to resign to "help restore peace and stability" after weeks of protests over the vote, adding that the military was calling on the Bolivian people to refrain from violence and disorder.

Approximately an hour later, Morales announced his immediate resignation via television from an undisclosed location.

11 November 
Protesters took to the streets to celebrate, chanting "yes we can" and setting off fire crackers. The police withdrew from La Paz streets as crowds welcomed the transfer of power with fireworks, while others looted stores and set reportedly politically motivated fires.

Protests were also held in support of Morales throughout Bolivia. El Alto was the site of a particularly large protest, in which multiple people were injured, with crowds chanting, "Now, civil war!" and waving the Wiphala indigenous flag.
The acting president, Jeanine Áñez, called for the military to support the police tasks. The head of Bolivia's military said that following reports police have been overtaxed by weeks of unrest, the armed forces would provide help in keeping order.

President of Mexico Andrés Manuel López Obrador offered Morales political asylum. The decision was criticized by the National Action Party and the Institutional Revolutionary Party.

12 November 
On 12 November Morales left Bolivia on a plane toward Mexico, accepting the political asylum offered by President Obrador. Former vice-president Álvaro García Linera also left the country. Jeanine Áñez, acting president of the Senate of Bolivia, called an extraordinary session of the Plurinational Legislative Assembly in order to ratify Morales's and the other officials' resignation. Áñez called to all deputies and senators to participate, including the ones of the Movement for Socialism.

At 18:48, citing article 169 of the Constitution of Bolivia, Jeanine Áñez declared herself as President of the Senate and acting President of Bolivia in front of the opposition senators in the Plurinational Legislative Assembly, the session was boycotted by members of the Movement for Socialism, which hold a majority in the assembly. The move was later upheld by the Plurinational Constitutional Tribunal.

Videos also emerged of Bolivian police cutting the wiphala off of their uniforms. It was also removed from some government buildings and burned by protesters, who chanted "Bolivia belongs to Christ!"

Pro-Morales and anti-Áñez protests 

Counter-protests have been held in favour of Evo Morales both before and after his resignation. They increased in severity following Morales' departure, with pro-Morales indigenous protesters cutting off major Bolivian roads. At least 20 people have died during the clashes.

12 November 
In La Paz, tens of thousands of pro-Morales protesters clashed with police, military and opposition forces as they attempted to make their way to the city's centre to protest Morales' removal. Another march of several thousand, held peacefully in the periphery of the town was held on the same day, with protesters lamenting the fact that military fighter aircraft flew over the city as military and security forces blocked them from reaching the city's main square.

In response, pro-Morales protesters blocked roads leading to the city's airport.

Demonstrators originating from El Alto, considered a "bastion of support" for Morales, further attempted to march to La Paz, but were stopped by more than 400 Bolivian policemen equipped with tear gas launches and water cannons and backed by the nation's military. Police, military and opposition forces set up roadblocks in anticipation of a renewed counter-demonstrator march on the city's centre.

13 November 
In the early hours of 13 November, following the proclamation of the new acting president, thousands of Morales supporters took to the street in support of their former president, calling his resignation a "Washington-backed coup d'état". A crowd managed to clear the way to Bolivia's national assembly in La Paz and protested the inauguration by waving indigenous wiphala flags that by that point had become a symbol for Morales supporters.

After videos showing the burning of the Wiphala, the multi-coloured flag of native people of the Andes, started circulating on social media, thousands of protesters took the streets waving the banner. Another video showed police officers cutting the flag out of their uniforms, which made a police officer issue an apology.

14 November 

On 14 November, Bolivian police used tear gas to break up a peaceful pro-Morales protest in La Paz. Following this, it blocked about a dozen pro-Morales senators from entering the nation's legislature, upon which pro-Morales demonstrators responded with cries of "dictatorship" and by throwing stones at the policemen.

In the Bolivian town of Sacaba, demonstrators took the streets and expressed their support for Morales.

15 November 

In Sacaba, nine people were killed and over 100 injured during clashes between security forces and protesters. This resulted after police and armed forces attempted to prevent them marching either central Sacaba or the city of Cochabamba. Demonstrators set off sticks of dynamite, while the police and armed forces tried to disperse them with tear gas. This quickly escalated into violence. raising the total death toll since 20 Oct to 23. A tenth demonstrator injured by gunfire died on June 11, 2020, after seven months with a bullet lodged in his head.

In response, Morales described the events as a "massacre" and the Añez-led government as a "dictatorship". UN High Commissioner for Human Rights Michelle Bachelet called the events an "extremely dangerous development". A UN envoy met with Añez shortly thereafter to relay the organization's "concern". Minister for the Government, Arturo Murillo, claimed that the army were not ordered to fire and implicated that the shots came from the side of the protesters. He also called for a "transparent" investigation by the attorney general's office. As of June 2020, the official investigation of the day's events has not progressed significantly.

16 November 
Añez announced in response to the killing protesters by the Armed forces, that the military would be exempt from any type of criminal responsibility, when acting in a "legitimate defense or state of necessity."

The Inter-American Commission on Human Rights commission condemned Añez's government for issuing the decree.

UN Human Rights Chief Michelle Bachelet issued a statement, saying that "while earlier deaths mostly resulted from clashes between rival protestors", the latest incidents appear to be due to the "disproportionate use of force by the army and police", stating that "in a situation like this, repressive actions by the authorities will simply stoke that anger even further and are likely to jeopardise any possible avenue for dialogue.". Bachelet also expressed concern that "widespread arrests and detentions" are adding to the tensions; according to her office, more than 600 people had been detained since 21 October, many in the past few days. Furthermore, Bachelet also declared being concerned that the situation could "spin out of control if the authorities do not handle it sensitively and in accordance with international norms and standards governing the use of force, and with full respect for human rights", stating that it couldn't be solved through "force and repression".

18 November 
The interim interior minister Arturo Murillo threatened to arrest MAS legislators, who refuse to recognize Añez's legitimacy, for "subversion." He also cautioned journalists reporting on the protests to "not commit sedition." Murillo further threatened to unveil a list of MAS legislators which he deemed had been involved in alleged "sedition".

Thousands of Bolivian coca farmers came out in protest in favour of Morales and called for the resignation of Añez as Acting President. Bolivian police fired tear gas in the country's highlands to prevent the demonstrators from reaching the city of Cochabamba. Some of the protesters responded to the launching of tear gas by throwing stones at the police officers, which in turn responded by arresting at least ten demonstrators.

19 November 

Senate president and MAS leader Mónica Eva Copa instructed MAS legislators in the Plurinational Legislative Assembly to cancel a planned vote to reject Morales' resignation. She later announced that legislation would be introduced to annul the 20 October election and move towards new elections as soon as possible.

Eight people were killed in clashes outside the major Senkata gasoline plant that had been blockaded for days by Morales supporters as police and military attempted to escort a fuel convoy to relieve shortages in La Paz.
Witnesses said that the men died when a military unit guarding the plant opened fire on the protesters that had surrounded it for over a week.
Bolivia's new defense minister, Fernando López, told reporters that “not one bullet” had been fired by the military at Senkata, an account that was contradicted by dozen of witnesses who had gathered at the church that night.

21 November 
Dozens of thousands of pro-Morales protesters marched some 15 km from El Alto to downtown La Paz in response to the killings at Senkata. They brought with them the coffins of five of the eight victims of the tragedy. Protesters were dispersed with tear gas, which also hit many passersby. Police on motorcycles continued to fire tear gas at hiding or retreating protesters, pushing them further from the San Francisco Square. The Anez-led interim government blamed Morales and "radical groups" of allegedly supporting the violence.

22 November 
The interim government opened an investigation into Morales for "terrorism and sedition." Hours later, the vice-president of MAS-IPSP was arrested while travelling in a vehicle without licence plates carrying a number of computers and biometric equipment taken from the electoral commission offices.

Responses

Reactions to fraud allegations

The suspension of the vote count generated criticism in the opposition and the electoral observation mission of the Organization of American States (OAS). In a press conference, the head of the electoral observation mission of the OAS, former Costa Rican foreign minister Manuel González, made a statement in which his team expressed concern about the drastic and unexplained changes published by the Supreme Electoral Tribunal that interpreted the victory of Evo Morales in the first round, saying "It is essential that the citizens will be fully respected by honoring the values contained in the OAS Inter-American Democratic Charter". In addition, the mission published a statement calling for respect for the will of the citizens.

Carlos Mesa called for civil mobilizations in defense of the vote after denouncing fraud in the elections. In a later video, Mesa called for constant protesting until a second round of voting was held, adding that he would bring proof of fraud.

Opposition candidate Óscar Ortiz called to demonstrate in peace to "maintain the legitimacy of the democratic claim."

The Bolivian Episcopal Conference (CEB) warned of fraud and demanded that the electoral authorities fulfill their duty as an "impartial arbitrator of the electoral process". The CEB also called on "international observers to fulfill their mission of monitoring the transparency of the electoral process" in order to respect the Bolivian people and the principles of democracy, noting that one of the observers for the election, the European Union, had financed the electronic vote count system and should, therefore, be mandated to ensure it is used properly.

The Minister of Justice, Héctor Arce, denied the alleged electoral fraud and said that the demonstrations are unjustified, since the electoral calculation process is free and public.

On 22 October, the Vice President of the Bolivian electoral board, Antonio Costas, described by news website Infobae as the only independent member of the TSE, resigned, criticizing the Electoral Tribunal for suspending the publication of the results of the TREP, saying that the issues with the count discredited the democratic process. Gunnar Vargas, also member of the electoral board, announced in the radio that he went into hiding for his personal safety.

The National Committee for the Defense of Democracy in Bolivia (Conade) held the Morales government responsible for any confrontation that may arise in the country, and called for an indefinite national strike from midnight on the morning of 23 October.

In a televised address on 23 October, Morales made a speech saying that there was a coup d'état underway in his country that had been orchestrated by right-wing groups in Bolivia with the aid of foreign powers; earlier that day, Manuel González opined that the second round should go ahead even if Morales is revealed to have achieved a lead of over 10 percentage points, as his vote margin (based on the earlier results) would still be "negligible".

On Saturday 26 October, after international calls for an audit of the electoral processes, Morales invited foreign governments to hold one, and promised to move the election to a run-off should any fraud be found.

In the announcement on Friday 8 November, Supreme Electoral Tribunal (TSE) denies that irregularities had taken place in the vote count. TSE referred critics to a report by the company Ethical Hacking, which had checked the electronic vote and did not find any kind of "alteration of the data." But the company's chief, Alvaro Andrade, said his firm did find "vulnerabilities" in the vote count.

Suspension of activities
The Bolivian Football Federation (FBF) suspended all matches on day 17 of the Clausura tournament of the Bolivian Primera División, due to a predicted lack of presence of both players and spectators because of the protests.

The Bolivian Association of Supermarkets announced that the opening hours of supermarkets and hypermarkets for the day of 25 October would be from 7:00 am through noon.

Media incidents and coverage
A correspondent for the Cochabamba newspaper Los Tiempos, Wilson Aguilar, said he was assaulted on 21 October by MAS supporters during the Supreme Electoral Tribunal conference in La Paz.

The newspaper El Deber reported that on the night of 21 October, Vice Minister of Communication Leyla Medinacelli called the newspaper to "ask for a headline" on the front page of the next day's edition, specifying that it should encourage protesters to "demobilize". The newspaper clarified that it does not allow people who are not their own journalists to "impose a headline".

On 10 November the newspaper Página Siete announced it would not publish its morning edition of 11 November due to security reasons. The website and social media later resumed its updating. Two days later on 12 November, the newspaper El Diario announced it would not publish its print edition of that day due to security reasons, while the online edition would still be updated.

Following Morales' resignation, a large anti-Morales Twitter bot network was uncovered by the microblogging site in mid November. The network had published automated tweets which declared opposition to Morales, further adding that the events were "not a coup". Compared to the extremely low proportion of the population that speaks English, the abundance of English tweets from this network suggests that it was intended to sway opinions beyond Bolivia. The company behind the site had removed many of the tweets by 19 November, but media reports suggested that around 4200 were still up by that point. The Caracas-based TeleSur network alleged that nearly 70,000 fake accounts had been used by the network, many of which were created days before. A Social Networks head working for the Spanish party Podemos further alleged that fake accounts were used to artificially boost the online following of anti-Morales political figures, including Añez.

Later responses 

On 21 January 2020, the interim government Department of Justice produced a 65-page document on cases where they believe human rights have been violated. This was created with the intention of presenting these cases to be investigated by the Inter-American Commission on Human Rights (IACHR) and to different embassies and international organizations. The report is in two parts, with the second relating to events of violence, sedition and terrorism that allegedly occurred since the 20 October elections.

See also
2008 unrest in Bolivia
2019 shortages in Bolivia
List of protests in the 21st century
2019–2020 Mexico–Bolivia diplomatic crisis
2020 Bolivian protests
2021 Bolivian protests

References

2019 controversies
2019 in Bolivia
2019 protests
2019 riots
Arson in South America
October 2019 events in South America
Political history of Bolivia
Protests against results of elections
Protests in Bolivia